Nyquist is a surname of Swedish origin. Nyquist and the alternatively spelled Nyqvist are derivates from the original spelling that is Nykvist, meaning "New Branch". Notable people with the surname include:

Ann-Christin Nyquist (born 1948), Swedish Social Democratic politician
Arild Nyquist (1937–2004), Norwegian novelist, lyricist, writer and musician
Dean Nyquist (1935–2014), American politician
Gustav Nyquist (born 1989), Swedish ice hockey player, currently in the NHL.
Harry Nyquist (1889–1976), Swedish-American electronic engineer
John W. Nyquist (born 1933), retired American Navy vice admiral
Kari Nyquist (1918–2011),  Norwegian ceramist, freelance artist and designer
Laurence E. Nyquist (born 1939), American planetary scientist
Michael Nyqvist (1960–2017), Swedish actor
Ove Nyquist Arup (1895–1988), Anglo-Danish architectural engineer, founder of engineering firm Arup
Paul Nyquist, president of the Moody Bible Institute in Chicago, IL
Ryan Nyquist (born 1979), American cyclist and motocross rider
Seth Nyquist alias MorMor (born 1992), Canadian singer-songwriter

Swedish-language surnames